Zusidava is a genus of moths belonging to the subfamily Drepaninae.

Species
Zusidava serratilinea (Wileman, 1917) 
Zusidava sinuosa (Moore, 1888) 
Zusidava tortricaria Walker, [1863]

References

Drepaninae
Drepanidae genera
Taxa named by Francis Walker (entomologist)